Adult Contemporary is a chart published by Billboard ranking the top-performing songs in the United States in the adult contemporary music (AC) market.  In 2006, 9 different songs topped the chart in 52 issues of the magazine, based on weekly airplay data from radio stations compiled by Nielsen Broadcast Data Systems.

In the first issue of Billboard of the new year, the number one song was "Up on the Housetop" by Kimberley Locke, which was in its fourth week atop the chart.  Canadian singer Daniel Powter's song "Bad Day" had the longest unbroken run of the year at number one, spending consecutive 18 weeks atop the chart, and also had the highest total number of weeks in the top spot, with 19 non-consecutive weeks in the peak position.  The song had been a major hit in Europe in 2005, but did not achieve success in the United States until the following year, after its use in the fifth season of the TV talent show American Idol to accompany video packages spotlighting each eliminated contestant.  Powter's song was one of only two AC number ones of 2006 to also top Billboards all-genre chart, the Hot 100, but the singer failed to achieve further success and came to be regarded as a one-hit wonder.  The same label has been attached to British singer James Blunt, whose song "You're Beautiful" was the other track to top both charts in 2006.

In the fall, country music group Rascal Flatts topped the AC chart for the first time with its version of the song "What Hurts the Most".  It was the trio's fifth Hot Country Songs chart-topper, but only its second song to crossover to the AC chart and the first to achieve sufficient spins on adult contemporary radio to top the listing.  The final two AC number ones of the year were both Christmas-themed, continuing a theme which began in the early 21st century, when stations of the relevant format began devoting their playlists exclusively to seasonal songs in December.  In the issue of Billboard dated December 23, Kimberley Locke achieved her second number one of the year with her version of "Jingle Bells", making her the only artist to appear at number one with two different songs in 2006.  The following week Hall & Oates took the top spot with their recording of the Christmas carol "It Came Upon a Midnight Clear", which was the final number one of the year.

Chart history

See also
2006 in music
List of artists who reached number one on the U.S. Adult Contemporary chart

References

2006
United States Adult Contemporary
2006 in American music